Rowntree is an English surname derived from "Rowan tree". It may refer to:

Rowntree's confectionery company and trusts
Rowntree's, a confectionery company in York, England previously owned by members of the Rowntree family
Rowntree trusts
Joseph Rowntree Charitable Trust
Joseph Rowntree Foundation

People

Rowntree's confectionery company family and close relatives
Arnold Stephenson Rowntree (1872–1951), Liberal MP for York
Benjamin Seebohm Rowntree (1871–1954), sociologist and businessman, also known as Seebohm Rowntree
Henry Isaac Rowntree (1837–1883), founder of the business
John Stephenson Rowntree (1834–1907)
John Wilhelm Rowntree (1868–1905), chocolate manufacturer and religious activist
Joseph Rowntree (educationist) (1801–1859), education leader
Joseph Rowntree (philanthropist) (1836–1925), cocoa and chocolate manufacturer and philanthropist
Joshua Rowntree (1844–1915), social reformer
Michael Rowntree (1919–2007), journalist and philanthropist

Unrelated persons
Catriona Rowntree (born 1971), Australian television personality
Dave Rowntree (born 1964), British musician
Fred Rowntree (1860–1927), Scottish architect
Gil Rowntree (born 1934), Canadian racehorse trainer and owner
Graham Rowntree (born 1971), English rugby union player
Joseph Rowntree (Canadian) pioneer of Thistletown, miller on the banks of the Humber River in 1843
Kenneth Rowntree (1915–1997), British artist
Leonard Rowntree (1883–1959), Canadian physician and medical researcher
Leslie Rowntree (1914–1975), Canadian political figure
Lester Gertrude Ellen Rowntree (1879–1979), American botanist and horticulturist
Mark Rowntree (born c. 1956), British spree killer
Norman Rowntree (1912–1991), British civil engineer
Richard Rowntree (1884–1968), English-born New Zealand cricketer

Other uses